The 1979 Kvalserien was the fifth edition of the Kvalserien. It determined which two teams of the participating ones would play in the 1979–80 Elitserien season and which three teams would play in the 1979–80 Swedish Division 1 season.

Tournament

External links
Tournament on hockeyarchives.info

Kvalserien
Kval